Helen is a 2009 American drama film starring Ashley Judd and directed by Sandra Nettelbeck. It follows a professor (Judd) who overcomes severe depression after a massive breakdown, with the help of new friend Matilda (Smith). Filming took place late 2007 in Vancouver.

Cast
 Ashley Judd as Helen Leonard, a college professor who is married to David, the ex-wife of Frank and mother of Julie.
 Goran Višnjić as David Leonard, Helen's husband and Julie's stepfather.
 Lauren Lee Smith as Mathilda, a young woman who Helen befriends during her treatment. 
 Alexia Fast as Julie, Helen and Frank's daughter and David's stepdaughter.
 Alberta Watson as Dr. Sherman
 Leah Cairns as Susanna
 David Hewlett as Frank, Julie's biological father and Helen's ex-husband. It is later revealed that Frank has been aware of Helen's fragile mental state and her illness for quite some time which presumably later caused their marriage to fail.
 David Nykl as John
 Chelah Horsdal as Kara
 Conrad Coates as Stephen
 Veena Sood as Defense Attorney

Release
The film was released at the Sundance Film Festival in January 2009, and later at the Atlantic Film Festival in Canada. Lauren Lee Smith won the award for Best Supporting Actress at the 2010 Leo Awards, beating co-star Alexia Fast. It was nominated for Best Feature and Production Design. Helen was released to DVD in August 2010. It currently holds a score of 44% on Rotten Tomatoes, based on 9 reviews.

External links
 
 
 
 New York Times Review
 Slant Magazine review

2009 films
American drama films
2009 drama films
Films shot in Vancouver
English-language German films
Films about depression
2000s English-language films
2000s American films